Pantelis Zervos (Born 1908 in Loutraki – January 22, 1982, in Athens) was a Greek theatrical and a film actor.

Biography
Zervos was born in Loutraki near Corinth in Perachora.  He attended the Art Theatre School with Karolos Koun (Coon).  He entered the theatrical scene from 1933 and participated with the greatest stars of the time as distinction in classic and main roles, even in modern Greek civics.

His most theatrical plays he acted was Alkistis (Alcestis), Antigoni (Antigone), Macbeth, Plutus, etc.

His presentation at the film saw him a great success.  Around 70 were his presentation in movies mostly on the work Madalena produced by Dinos Dimopoulos (1960), he awarded the first award on his second male role at the Thessaloniki Film Festival in 1960.  His other appearances include Raw Bread (1915), [[O agapitikos tis voskopoulas (1955), Makrykostaioi kai Kontogiorgides (1960), Ziteitai pseftis (1961), O Atsidas (1962), Lola (1964), A Student with Blonde Hair (1969) and Maria tis siopis (1973).

Other than his radio and television appearances, Zervos left history, different in everyday radio broadcasts To 5lepto enos thyrorou.

Pantelis Zervos was a member of the Greek Actos Guild and the Artists Council of the National Theatre.  He participated in many theatrical periodicals in and out of Greece in which he took part distinctively.  For his theatricals he was awarded the Order of the Golden Cross by George I and King Paul.

He lived along in Palaio Faliro in Athens and spoke English.  He died on January 22, 1982 at the age of 73.  He is buried in Palaio Faliro.  He raised two daughters.

Filmography

External links

1908 births
1982 deaths
Male actors from Athens
20th-century Greek male actors
People from Corinthia